The Maguse River is located in the Kivalliq Region of northern Canada's territory of Nunavut. It originates at Maguse Lake and flows  eastward to northwestern Hudson Bay. At one time, there was a trading post at the mouth of the river.

See also
List of rivers of Nunavut

References

Rivers of Kivalliq Region
Tributaries of Hudson Bay